Fani Tzeli (born 20 November 2001) is a Greek taekwondo athlete. She won a bronze medal for Greece at the 2017 European Taekwondo Junior Championships  and another one at the 2017 World Taekwondo Junior Championships. In 2018, she participated at the 2018 Summer Youth Olympics where she came third, winning the bronze medal.

References

External links
 

Greek female taekwondo practitioners
Living people
2001 births
Taekwondo practitioners at the 2018 Summer Youth Olympics
Taekwondo practitioners at the 2020 Summer Olympics
Olympic taekwondo practitioners of Greece
21st-century Greek women